The Molson Bank Building was built at the corner of St. Peter and St. James streets (now rue Saint-Pierre and rue Saint-Jacques) in Old Montreal as the headquarters of the Molson Bank in 1866 by order of founder William Molson (1793-1875). It was the first building in Montreal to be built in the Second Empire style, designed by George Browne working with his son John James George Browne. It is also known as The Downtown Eastside or the Roosevelt Hotel.

The bank later merged with Bank of Montreal in 1925.

History 
The proliferation of businesses led to the construction of several hotels and lodgings meant to accommodate the burgeoning blue-collar population. The Downtown Eastside became the centre of political and cultural life in the early 20th century as commercial activity extended beyond Gastown. The bank had 125 branches across the country by 1925, the year it was absorbed by the Bank of Montreal. The building evokes a similar styling as other early 20th century banks across Canada. Advances in building construction and technology meant that the Edwardian commercial style building could rise to a higher zenith. The six-storey, reinforced concrete building did just that: Its facade was fashioned in terra cotta, a reflection of predominant trends south of the border. Like all financial institutions at the time, the Bank of Montreal used architecture to convey strength and stability to its clients.The ornate exterior was coupled with a marble-laden interior that projected high status and permanence. The majesty of the building spoke to the fortune of its tenant and the city as a whole.

See also

 Old Royal Bank Building, Montreal
 Tour CIBC
 Bank of Montreal Head Office, Montreal
 Old Canadian Bank of Commerce Building, Montreal

References

Rémillard, François, Old Montreal - A Walking Tour, Ministère des Affaires culturelles du Québec,  1992

1866 establishments in Canada
Bank of Montreal
Commercial buildings in Montreal
Commercial buildings completed in 1866
Historic bank buildings in Canada
Molson family
Old Montreal
Second Empire architecture in Canada
George Browne buildings